Lakeland Baptist Church is a Baptist church located in Lewisville, Texas. It is affiliated with the Southern Baptist Convention.

History
During the late 1950s and early 1960s, Jim Angel, a resident of Denton who worked at Southwestern Bell in Dallas, noticed that several new houses were being built on the west side of Interstate 35E in Lewisville (at that time, the majority of the small community was located on the east side).  The new subdivision was named Lakeland for its proximity to nearby Lewisville Lake.

Angel believed that God was leading him to start a new church in the area to reach the residents of the growing subdivision.  Using their property as collateral, Angel and his wife Darlene purchased a plot of land at 397 South Stemmons Freeway, which today remains the church's address.

The church (named after the subdivision in which it was located) held its first services on June 25, 1962 with 34 in attendance, and simultaneously held a ground-breaking ceremony for its first facility. During the first service, ten persons joined by letter and six made salvation decisions.

Angel would remain as pastor until 1967, when he would resign to begin another startup ministry, nearby Camp Copass in Denton.  During his five years, Lakeland would baptize over 200 individuals.

Garland Beasley would become Lakeland's second pastor in 1967, and would continue to maintain Lakeland's successful ministry until his resignation in 1974.

The Ben Smith Era
Dr. Ben Smith, Lakeland's third pastor, was called in December 1974 and retired in 2007.

Lakeland has arguably had its greatest success since 1974, which can be attributed equally to Dr. Smith's leadership and to Lewisville's growth from rural farming community to Dallas-Fort Worth Metroplex suburb.  From 1974 to 1998, Lakeland:
 baptized 1,926 individuals,
 donated over $5 million to mission causes locally and abroad,
 started 14 mission churches, several of which have become successful congregations, and
 greatly expanded its facilities (Lakeland built a Family Life Center in 1976, which served as its auditorium until 1989 when its current auditorium – dubbed "The House of Prayer" – was completed, a three-story Educational wing in 1998, and significantly renovated the facility in the early 2000s to move the main entrance away from the busy Interstate 35E frontage roads).

2008
On Sunday June 1, 2008 Lakeland members voted in Dr. Ron Osborne as their Senior Pastor. 

In November 2014, Dr. Donald Schmidt was elected Senior Pastor.

Lakeland leases their facilities to a private school, Lakeland Christian Academy.  The school currently operates a preschool on the bottom floor, in the facilities normally used for children's Sunday School, and other grade levels are on the second and third floor.

Beliefs 
Lakeland is affiliated with the Southern Baptist Convention.

It is affiliated with the Southern Baptists of Texas and the North Texas Baptist Association (the Association's offices are located at the southeast corner of Lakeland's property).

References

External links

Lakeland Christian Academy

Lewisville, Texas
Churches in the Dallas–Fort Worth metroplex
Baptist churches in Texas
Southern Baptist Convention churches
Christian organizations established in 1962